Hugo Adam Bedau (September 23, 1926 – August 13, 2012) was the Austin B. Fletcher Professor of Philosophy, Emeritus, at Tufts University, and is best known for his work on capital punishment. He has been called a "leading anti-death-penalty scholar" by Stuart Taylor Jr., who has quoted Bedau as saying "I'll let the criminal justice system execute all the McVeighs they can capture, provided they'd sentence to prison all the people who are not like McVeigh."

Career
Bedau earned his PhD from Harvard University in 1961 and subsequently taught at Dartmouth College, Princeton University and Reed College before joining Tufts in 1966. He retired in 1999. Bedau was a founding member of the National Coalition to Abolish the Death Penalty, and served many years on its board of directors, including several as chairman. He was a member of the American Civil Liberties Union, for whom he wrote on the death penalty.

Bedau was the author of The Death Penalty in America (1st edition, 1964; 4th edition, 1997), The Courts, the Constitution, and Capital Punishment (1977), Death is Different (1987), and Killing as Punishment (2004), and co-author of In Spite of Innocence (1992). On the occasion of Bedau's retirement, Norman Daniels said of The Death Penalty in America: "It is the premier example in this century of the systematic application of academic philosophical skills to a practical issue, and the flood of work in practical ethics that has followed can rightfully cite Hugo's work as its starting point."

Bedau also published Civil Disobedience: Theory and Practice (Pegasus, 1969) and a later volume on the theory of civil disobedience.

Personal life
Bedau married twice. His first marriage to Jan Mastin, by whom he had four children, including the philosopher Mark Bedau, ended in divorce. His second marriage, in 1990, was to Constance E. Putnam, a medical historian.

See also 
 American philosophy
 List of American philosophers

References

External links 
 Faculty Profile at Tufts University

1926 births
2012 deaths
Philosophers from Massachusetts
Harvard University alumni
Tufts University faculty
Neurological disease deaths in the United States
Deaths from Parkinson's disease